"Pneuma" is a song by American rock band Tool, released as their second single in April 2020 off of their fifth studio album Fear Inoculum. It peaked at number 15 on the Billboard Mainstream Rock Songs chart.

Background
The song was first released on the band's fifth studio album, Fear Inoculum on August 30, 2019; it was not a song that had been teased or played live prior to the album's release. It was first performed live in mid-October of the same year at the Aftershock Festival. The song was released as the second single from the album in early 2020, and spent twenty weeks on the Billboard Mainstream Rock Songs chart, peaking at number 15.

Band members gave the song particular attention, with publications noting members releasing extra footage of the song, including a specific "drummer-cam" video of drummer Danny Carey performing his parts of the song, and guitarist Adam Jones releasing a guitar-tutorial on how to play the last verse's guitar riff. This was considered rare, with the band usually being cryptic and generally withholding information from the public.

Composition and themes
The song was described as having a mellow start that builds in intensity over the course of its eleven-minute playtime. The track has multiple lengthy instrumental interludes, some parts focusing on drumming, others on guitar parts. It was described as "atmospheric" and "trippy", while containing "middle-eastern" styled drumming. Jones describes the song's guitar part as "not difficult to play, but very satisfying". He also noted that Justin Chancellor's bass riff "stays on the original [guitar] riff so there are some nice little conflicting moments between the two parts".

Thematically, the song is titled after the Greek term for spirit or soul, pneuma, and contains many allusions to "breathing".

Reception
The song was noted as a standout track from the Fear Inoculum album. Revolver described Danny Carey's drumming on the track as "jaw-dropping" and "almost supernatural". Metal Injection praised Carey's performance as "absolutely slaying". Loudwire noted the song had become a favorite among the band's fanbase as well.

Personnel
 Maynard James Keenan – vocals
 Adam Jones – guitar
 Justin Chancellor – bass
 Danny Carey – drums

Charts

References

2020 songs
2020 singles
Tool (band) songs